Makkum may refer to:

Places in the Netherlands
Makkum, Drenthe, a hamlet in the municipality of Midden-Drenthe, Drenthe province
Makkum, Littenseradiel, a village in the municipality of Littenseradiel, Friesland province
Makkum, Súdwest-Fryslân, a village in the municipality of Súdwest-Fryslân, Friesland province

Other uses
Royal Tichelaar Makkum, a Dutch pottery company

See also
 Mackem, a nickname for people from Sunderland
Molen van Makkum, a smock mill in Makkum, Drenthe province